The Central District of Nehbandan County is a district (bakhsh) in Nehbandan County, South Khorasan Province, Iran. At the 2006 census, its population was 41,906, in 9,772 families.  The District has one city: Nehbandan.  The District has three rural districts (dehestan): Bandan Rural District, Meyghan Rural District, and Neh Rural District.

References 

Districts of South Khorasan Province
Nehbandan County